The governor of the Commonwealth of Pennsylvania is the head of state and head of government of the U.S. state, Commonwealth of Pennsylvania, as well as commander-in-chief of the Commonwealth's military forces.

The governor has a duty to enforce state laws and the power to approve or veto bills passed by the Pennsylvania Legislature and to convene the legislature. The governor may grant pardons except in cases of impeachment, but only when recommended by the Board of Pardons.

There have been seven presidents and 48 governors of Pennsylvania, with two governors (Robert E. Pattison and Gifford Pinchot) serving non-consecutive terms, totaling 55 terms in both offices. The longest term was that of the first governor, Thomas Mifflin, who served three full terms as governor in addition to two years as President of the Continental Congress. The shortest term belonged to John Bell, who served only 19 days as acting governor after his predecessor, Edward Martin, resigned. 

The current governor is Josh Shapiro, who took office on January 17, 2023.

Governors
Pennsylvania was one of the original Thirteen Colonies, and was admitted as a state on December 12, 1787. Prior to declaring its independence, Pennsylvania was a colony of the Kingdom of Great Britain; see the list of colonial governors for the pre-statehood period.

Presidents of the Supreme Executive Council
The first Pennsylvania constitution in 1776 created the Supreme Executive Council as the state's executive branch, with the President of the Commonwealth of Pennsylvania as its head. The president was chosen annually by the council, though with no specific term dates.

The original 1776 constitution created the position of "vice-president", though no provision was made if the office of the president became vacant, which occurred four times later. Contemporary sources continue to label the chief executive in such times as the vice president, without any notion of succeeding in the presidency. One acting president, George Bryan, was subsequently recognized later as a full-fledged governor, due to his acting as president for over six months.

Governors of the Commonwealth of Pennsylvania

The 1790 constitution abolished the council and replaced the president with a governor, and established a three-year term for governor commencing on the third Tuesday of the December following the election, with governors not allowed to serve more than nine out of any twelve years. The 1838 constitution moved the start of the term to the third Tuesday of the January following the election, and allowed governors to only serve six out of any nine years. The 1874 constitution lengthened the term to four years, and prohibited governors from succeeding themselves. The current constitution of 1968 changed this to allow governors to serve two consecutive terms, with no lifetime limit.

Under the earlier  1968 constitution, Milton Shapp was the first governor to serve two terms, and Tom Corbett was the first incumbent governor to lose a re-election bid.

If the office of governor becomes vacant through death, resignation, or conviction on impeachment, the lieutenant governor becomes governor for the remainder of the term; if the office is only temporarily vacant due to disability of the governor, the lieutenant governor only acts out the duties of governor. Should both offices be vacant, the president pro tempore of the state senate becomes governor. The position of a lieutenant  governor was created in the 1874 constitution; prior to then, the speaker of the senate would act as governor in cases of vacancy. Originally, the lieutenant governor could only act as governor; it was not until the 1968 constitution that the lieutenant governor could actually become the sitting governor in that fashion. The office of governor has been vacant for an extended period once before, a 17-day gap in 1848 between the resignation of the previous governor and the swearing in of his acting successor. Governors and lieutenant governors are elected on the same political party ticket.

 Parties

Succession

See also
List of Pennsylvania gubernatorial elections
 List of Pennsylvania state legislatures
List of colonial governors of Pennsylvania

Notes

References
General

 

Constitutions

 
 
 
 
 

Specific

External links

 Office of the Governor of Pennsylvania
 Pennsylvania Politicals

 
Governors
Lists of state governors of the United States
Offices of state governors of the United States by state